Ernest Carl Watson (11 November 1904 – 26 February 1960) was an Australian rules footballer who played with Richmond and Essendon  in the Victorian Football League (VFL).

Family
The son of Frank Watson (1878-1957), and Emily May Watson (1878-1941), née Elmer, Ernest Carl Watson was born at Deloraine, Tasmania on 11 November 1904.

He married Julia Phyllis Gladys Hanson (1908-1972) in 1935.

Football
Watson came to Richmond from Tasmanian club Latrobe.

Richmond (VFL)
He played on a wing for Richmond in the 1928 VFL Grand Final and 1929 VFL Grand Final. Richmond were beaten in both matches.

Essendon (VFL)
He moved to Essendon for the 1932 VFL season.

Oakleigh (VFA)
Cleared from Essendon in 1931, he played with the VFA club Oakleigh for nine seasons.

Athlete
He was a well-performed professional sprinter, winning, among other victories, the 1924 (130 yards) Ulverstone Cup, running off 12 yards (Ted Terry, running off 11 yards was third).

Employment
Outside of football, he was employed as a fireman.

Notes

References
 Hogan P: The Tigers Of Old, Richmond FC, (Melbourne), 1996. 
 
 Maplestone, M., Flying Higher: History of the Essendon Football Club 1872–1996, Essendon Football Club, (Melbourne), 1996.

External links
 
 
 Carl Watson, at Boyles Football Photos
 Ernie Watson, at The VFA Project

1904 births
1960 deaths
Australian rules footballers from Tasmania
Latrobe Football Club players
Australian male sprinters
Richmond Football Club players
Essendon Football Club players
Camberwell Football Club players